Hugh Gilgan (1852 – June 17, 1887) was an Irish Major League Baseball player who played in two games for the Brooklyn Atlantics in 1875.

He collected two hits in eight at bats as a catcher and right fielder.

External links

Brooklyn Atlantics players
Major League Baseball catchers
Major League Baseball right fielders
19th-century baseball players
Major League Baseball players from Ireland
Irish baseball players
Irish emigrants to the United States (before 1923)
1852 births
1887 deaths
Burials at Calvary Cemetery (Queens)